DYAP (765 AM) Radyo Patrol was a radio station owned and operated by ABS-CBN Corporation. The station's studio and transmitter were located at the ABS-CBN Broadcast Center, Mabini St. cor. Valencia St., Brgy. Masipag, Puerto Princesa.

Established in 1965 as DYPR, it is the pioneer station in Palawan. It was formerly owned by Palawan Broadcasting Corporation until 2011, when it was acquired by ABS-CBN and rebranded as Radyo Patrol. Since then, the former staff of DYPR established DZIP.

On May 5, 2020, the station suspended its broadcasting activities, following the cease-and-desist order issued by the National Telecommunications Commission due to the expiration of ABS-CBN's legislative license to operate. On May 8, 2020, most of its programming resumed via online feed.

References

Radio stations in Puerto Princesa
Radio stations established in 1965
News and talk radio stations in the Philippines
Radyo Patrol stations
Radio stations disestablished in 2020
Defunct radio stations in the Philippines